Shall I Compare You to a Spring Day is a 2017 Chinese television series based on the novel Beijing, Beijing by Feng Tang. Starring Zhang Yishan and Zhou Dongyu, the series is a coming-of-age story about young love and brotherhood among a group of youths, who lived during the revolutionary times of Beijing. It premiered on Youku on 21 July 2017, and airs one episode from Monday to Friday.

Synopsis
Qiu Shui is artistically inclined and loves creating literary works, but enters med school according to his father's wishes. During military training, he meets his classmates - Xiao Hong, Xiao Bai, Zhao Yingnan etc., and gets into a relationship with Zhao Yingnan. Four years later, Qiu Shui has become a medical intern. Zhao Yingnan wants Qiu Shui to become an exemplary doctor, and she attempted to meddle in Qiu Shui's literary works. This caused Qiu Shui to struggle and doubt himself. In the end, he chooses to break up with Zhao Yingnan. Meanwhile, Xiao Hong encourages Qiu Shu to realizes his dreams, and they eventually became a couple. However, their relationship was destroyed by his mother and they were forced to separate. Many years later, Qiu Shui becomes a successful businessman and writer; and he also meets Xiao Hong again...

Cast

Main 
Zhang Yishan as Qiu Shui 
A playful but charming man who is well-versed in arts, business, and medical skills. 
Zhou Dongyu as Xiao Hong
A silly and childish girl who can be unrestrained in her actions, but is sincere toward people and persistent in love.

Supporting

Classmates 
You Jingru as Zhao Yingnan 
Qiu Shui's first love. The female chairperson of the class. Coming from a military family, she is seen as the perfect model student for her highly disciplined nature and logical thinking. 
Chen Yilong as Xiao Bai 
Qiu Shui's good friend, part of the 'troublemaker trio' with Qiu Shui and Xin Yi. An overseas returnee from San Francisco, he does not understand many things and can be blur at times. He falls in love with Xiao Hong at first sight.  
Wei Jianlong as Xin Yi 
Qiu Shui's good friend, part of the 'troublemaker trio' with Qiu Shui and Xiao Bai. He likes Yao Dao.  
Yang Yue as Yao Dao 
A studious girl who often wakes up early and stays up late to study English phrases. 
Zhou Shuai as Hou Pu 
The male chairperson of the class. He is not good at interpersonal relationships and can be unyielding at times.
Sun Weihao as Du Zhong 
Qiu Shui's bunk mate. He is an avid gamer. 
Fang Chuan as Wang Xiuyu  
Hua Qiao as Liu Tingting 
Ma Xinyi as Gu Xiaoman
Liu Chenglin as Huang Qi
Sun Youyue as You Yue

Others 
Qi Xi as Liu Qing
A fellow doctor who is Qiu Shui's senior, and later becomes his girlfriend. 
Liu Chao as Instructor Dai 
Ni Songyang as Instructor Song
Wen Liqin as Department Head Lu
Shi Bai Xin Hui as Shi Baihui, Xiao Hong's close friend
Wang Qian as Li Dachuan 
Wang Changchang as Zhou Xiaohe

Special appearance 
Fo Rena as Qiu Shui's mother 
Van Fan as Elder Brother Shou

Soundtrack

Awards and nominations

References 

Chinese romance television series
2017 Chinese television series debuts
Television shows based on Chinese novels
Shandong Television original programming
Chinese web series
Youku original programming
2017 web series debuts